The Women's 3000m race of the 2011 World Single Distance Speed Skating Championships was held on March 10 at 16:30 local time.

Results

References

2011 World Single Distance Speed Skating Championships
World